Distribution function may refer to
Cumulative distribution function, a basic concept of probability theory
Distribution function (physics), a function giving the number of particles per unit volume in single-particle phase space
Distribution function (measure theory), a generalization of the probability theoretical concept